Najarian is a surname. Notable people with the surname include
 Ara Najarian (born 1959), American politician
 John Najarian (1927–2020), American surgeon
 Kayvan Najarian, Iranian scientist
 Michael Najarian (born 1952), American radio host
 Nazar Najarian, Lebanese politician of Armenian descent 
 Peter Najarian (born 1963), American television personality
 Pete Najarian (writer) (born 1940), American writer

Armenian-language surnames